Kaikoura Island (formerly known as Selwyn Island) lies in an irregularly-shaped bay on the western side of Great Barrier Island in the Hauraki Gulf in New Zealand,  north east of Auckland. Kaikoura Island is the seventh largest island in the Hauraki Gulf. It is 80 metres from Great Barrier Island at its closest point and forms the natural harbours of Port FitzRoy and Port Abercrombie. Its biota includes the endangered brown teal duck, the North Island kaka and many native trees and shrubs.

In 2004 it was purchased from private ownership by the government's Nature Heritage Fund, other government agencies and private trusts to become a public reserve. The Motu Kaikoura Trust was set up to restore, control and manage the island.

See also
 List of islands of New Zealand

References

External links
 Motu Kaikoura Trust
 Kaikoura Island

Islands of the Hauraki Gulf
Islands of the Auckland Region
Uninhabited islands of New Zealand